Bekzod Makhamadzhonovich Abdurakhmonov (born 15 March 1990) is an Uzbekistani freestyle wrestler and mixed martial artist. He won the gold medal at the 2014 Asian Games in the Men's 70 kg Freestyle wrestling. At the 2016 Olympics he beat former gold medalist Jordan Burroughs of the United States 11-1, but lost in the bronze-medal match to Jabrayil Hasanov of Azerbaijan. He won one of the bronze medals in the men's 74 kg event at the 2020 Summer Olympics held in Tokyo, Japan.

In 2017, he won the gold medal in the men's 74 kg event at the 2017 Asian Wrestling Championships in New Delhi, India. In the final he defeated Muslim Evloev of Kyrgyzstan.

Bekzod Abdurakhmonov also wrestled under folkstyle rules in America's NCAA D1 where he achieved All-American status for Pennsylvania's Clarion University in 2012, finishing in 3rd place.

Mixed Martial Arts Record

|-
| Win
| align=center| 7–0
| Beksultan Kaipnazarov
| Decision (split)
| World Ertaymash Federation
| 
| align=center| 3
| align=center| 15:00
| Bishkek, Kyrgyzstan
| 
|-
| Win
| align=center| 6–0
| Marcel Goncalves
| Knockout (punches)
| Victory Combat Sports 6
| 
| align=center| 1
| align=center| 1:13
| Boston, Massachusetts, United States
| 
|-
| Win
| align=center| 5–0
| Andrew Osborne
| Submission (rare naked choke)
| CES 21
| 
| align=center| 1
| align=center| 3:54
| Lincoln, Rhode Island, United States
| 
|-
| Win
| align=center| 4–0
| Christian Leonard
| Submission (arm triangle)
| CFFC 29: Smith vs. Kelleher
| 
| align=center| 3
| align=center| 2:12
| King of Prussia, Pennsylvania, United States
| 
|-
| Win
| align=center| 3–0
| Phil Parrish
| KO/TKO (punches)
| Sherman Cage Rage
| 
| align=center| 1
| align=center| 4:31
| Stroudsburg, Pennsylvania, United States
| 
|-
| Win
| align=center| 2–0
| Stephen Singleton
| Knockout (head kick)
| Quaker Steak & Lube Fight Night 1
| 
| align=center| 1
| align=center| 1:54
| Sharon, Pennsylvania, United States
| 
|-
| Win
| align=center| 1–0
| Eric Calderon
| Submission (rear naked choke)
| Gladiators of the Cage
| 
| align=center| 1
| align=center| 1:46
| Pittsburgh, Pennsylvania, United States
|

References

External links
 
 
 
 

1990 births
Living people
Uzbekistani male sport wrestlers
Uzbekistani male mixed martial artists
Mixed martial artists utilizing freestyle wrestling
Mixed martial artists utilizing collegiate wrestling
Olympic wrestlers of Uzbekistan
Olympic medalists in wrestling
Olympic bronze medalists for Uzbekistan
Wrestlers at the 2016 Summer Olympics
Wrestlers at the 2020 Summer Olympics
Medalists at the 2020 Summer Olympics
Asian Games medalists in wrestling
Asian Games gold medalists for Uzbekistan
Wrestlers at the 2014 Asian Games
Wrestlers at the 2018 Asian Games
Medalists at the 2014 Asian Games
Medalists at the 2018 Asian Games
World Wrestling Championships medalists
Asian Wrestling Championships medalists
Islamic Solidarity Games medalists in wrestling
Islamic Solidarity Games competitors for Uzbekistan
20th-century Uzbekistani people
21st-century Uzbekistani people